Regressus is the second studio album by German Power metal group Mystic Prophecy.

Track listing
All lyrics by: R.D Liapakis
All music by: R.D. Liapakis & Gus G.,
except track 6 by: Albrecht
All songs arranged by: R.D. Liapakis & Gus G.

 "Calling From Hell" - 4:31
 "Eternal Flame" - 4:44
 "Lords Of Pain" - 4:30
 "Sign Of The Cross" - 4:01
 "Night Of The Storm" - 4:24
 "The Traveller (Instrumental)" - 0:50
 "In Your Sins" - 4:56
 "Forgotten Soul" - 3:36
 "When Demons Return"- 4:44
 "Regressus / Lost In Time" - 5:24
 "Mystic Prophecy" - 4:27
 "The Land Of The Dead" - 4:43
 "Fighting the World" (Cover)

Album line-up
 Roberto Dimitri Liapakis  -   Vocals
 Gus G.   -    Guitars
 Martin Albrecht   -   Bass
 Dennis Ekdahl       -   Drums

2003 albums
Mystic Prophecy albums
Nuclear Blast albums